Taylor Creek or Taylors Creek may refer to:

Watercourses
In United States
Taylor Creek (Lake Tahoe), California
 Taylor Creek (Okeechobee, Florida), see Okeechobee, Florida
Taylor Creek (Ohio River), Kentucky
Taylors Creek, Kentucky
Taylor Creek (Duck River), Tennessee
Taylor Creek (Seattle), Washington
Taylor Creek (Chestatee River), Georgia

Elsewhere
Taylor-Massey Creek (Don), Toronto, Ontario, Canada
Taylor Creek (Ottawa), a tributary of the Ottawa River

Communities
Taylor Creek, Florida, United States
Taylor Creek, Ohio (Hamilton County), United States
Taylor Creek Township, Hardin County, Ohio, United States

Other
Taylors Creek Trail, Australia
Taylor Creek Wilderness, Utah, United States